Desmodium glabellum (Dillenius' ticktrefoil or tall tick-trefoil) is a perennial herb and wildflower in the pea family native to eastern and central North America.  It grows in fields, woodland borders, and disturbed areas.

Description
Desmodium glabellum grows to 5 feet tall with alternate palmately trifoliate leaves. Light pink to purplish flowers appear June through September. Seeds in sticky pods arranged in a row of 2-5 segments appear August–October.  This species is very similar to Desmodium perplexum from which it was recently split.

References

glabellum
Flora of the United States